The 2019–20 Regional Super50 was the 46th edition of the Regional Super50, the domestic limited-overs cricket competition for the countries of the Cricket West Indies (CWI). The tournament started on 6 November 2019, with the final taking place on 1 December 2019. The tournament featured the six regular teams of West Indian domestic cricket (Barbados, Guyana, Jamaica, the Leeward Islands, Trinidad and Tobago, and the Windward Islands), the Combined Campuses and Colleges team and the West Indies Emerging Team. The national teams of the United States and Canada also took part. Combined Campuses and Colleges were the defending champions.

Following the conclusion of the group stage matches, Barbados, the Leeward Islands, Trinidad and Tobago and the West Indies Emerging Team had progressed to the semi-finals. In the first semi-final, the West Indies Emerging Team beat Barbados by three wickets in a rain-affected match. The second semi-final saw the Leeward Islands beat Trinidad and Tobago by four wickets to advance to the final. The West Indies Emerging Team won the tournament, beating the Leeward Islands by 205 runs in the final.

Squads

Points tables

Group A

Group B

Fixtures

Group A

Group B

Finals

References

External links
 Series home at ESPN Cricinfo

2019 in West Indian cricket
Regional Super50
Regional Super50 seasons